Live at the Matterhorn is the first live album by reggae band Fat Freddy's Drop.

The album was recorded live at the Matterhorn restaurant in Cuba Mall, Wellington, New Zealand. The cover of the album features a photo of The Bucket Fountain, which is located near the Matterhorn. Although the album only contains four songs it plays for 70 minutes.

Out of print since 2004, Live at the Matterhorn was re-released on June 24, 2005 after the debut of their second album, Based on a True Story, having since become a Gold Record, selling over 10,000 copies.

Track listing
"Runnin" – 21:28
"Rain" – 18:05
"No Parking" – 18:36
"Bounce" – 11:59

External links
Amplifier.co.nz - Live at the Matterhorn

Fat Freddy's Drop albums
2001 live albums